t Haantje is a hamlet in the Dutch province of North Brabant. It is located in the municipality of Steenbergen, about 2 km west of Kruisland.

't Haantje is not a statistical entity, and the postal authorities have placed it under Steenbergen. It has no place name signs, and was named after the inn Het Hanengevecht. The hamlet consists of about 20 houses.

References

Populated places in North Brabant
Steenbergen